Asha Bhosle (Mangeshkar; born 8 September 1933) is an Indian playback singer, entrepreneur, actress and television personality who predominantly works in Indian cinema. Known for her versatility, she has been described in the media as one of the most influential and successful singers in Hindi Cinema. In her career spanning over eight decades she has recorded songs for films and albums in various Indian languages and received several accolades including two National Film Awards, four BFJA Awards, eighteen Maharashtra State Film Awards, nine Filmfare Awards including a Lifetime Achievement Award and a record seven Filmfare Awards for Best Female Playback Singer, in addition to two Grammy nominations. In 2000, she was honoured with the Dadasaheb Phalke Award, India's highest award in the field of cinema. In 2008, she was honoured by the Government of India with the Padma Vibhushan, the second-highest civilian honour of the country. The Guinness Book of World Records acknowledged Bhosle in 2011 as the most recorded artist in music history.

Bhosle is the sister of playback singer Lata Mangeshkar and belongs to the prominent Mangeshkar family. Renowned for her soprano voice range and often credited for her versatility, Bhosle's work includes film music, pop, ghazals, bhajans, traditional Indian classical music, folk songs, qawwalis, and Rabindra Sangeet. Apart from Hindi, she has sung in over 20 Indian and foreign languages. In 2013, she made her debut as an actress in the film Mai, and received critical acclaim for her performance. In 2006, Bhosle stated that she has recorded over twelve thousand songs in her career. a figure repeated by several other sources. Asha Bhosle's granddaughter Zanai made her 89th birthday special with her poem 8th September 2022.

Early life and career
Asha Mangeshkar was born in the small hamlet of Goar in Sangli, then in the salute princely state of Sangli (now in Maharashtra), into the musical family of Deenanath Mangeshkar, who was Marathi and Konkani, and his Gujarati wife, Shevanti. Deenanath was an actor and classical singer on the Marathi Musical stage. When Asha was nine years old, her father died. The family moved from Pune to Kolhapur and then to Mumbai. She and her elder sister Lata Mangeshkar began singing and acting in films to support their family. She sang her first film song '"Chala Chala Nav Bala" for the Marathi film Majha Bal (1943). The music for the film was composed by Datta Davjekar. She made her Hindi film debut when she sang the song "Saawan Aaya" for Hansraj Behl's Chunariya (1948). Her first solo Hindi film song was for the movie Raat Ki Raani (1949).

At the age of 16, she eloped with 31-year-old Ganpatrao Bhosle, marrying him against her family's wishes.

Career

In the early 1960s, prominent playback singers such as Geeta Dutt, Shamshad Begum, and Lata Mangeshkar dominated the singing for the female lead and the big films. Asha used to get the assignments they refused, singing for the bad girls and vamps, or songs in low-budget movies. In the 1950s, she sang more songs than most playback singers in Hindi films. Most of these were in low budget B- or C-grade films. Her earliest songs were composed by A. R. Qureshi, Sajjad Hussain, and Ghulam Mohammed, and most of these songs failed to do well. Singing in Sangdil (1952), composed by Sajjad Hussain, she got reasonable recognition. Consequently, film director Bimal Roy gave her a chance to sing in Parineeta (1953). Raj Kapoor signed her to sing "Nanhe Munne Bachche" with Mohammed Rafi in Boot Polish (1954), which gained popularity.

O. P. Nayyar gave Asha a break in C.I.D. (1956). She first achieved success in B. R. Chopra's Naya Daur (1957), composed by him. Her duets with Rafi like "Maang Ke Saath Tumhara", "Saathi Haath Badhana" and "Uden Jab Jab Zulfein Teri", penned by Sahir Ludhianvi, earned her recognition. It was the first time she sang all the songs for a film's leading actress. Chopra approached her for several of his later productions, including Gumrah (1963), Waqt (1965), Hamraaz (1967), Aadmi Aur Insaan (1966) and Dhund (1973). Nayyar's future collaboration with Bhosle also resulted in success. Gradually, she established her status and received the patronage of such composers as Sachin Dev Burman and Ravi. Bhosle and Nayyar had a professional and personal parting of ways in the 1970s.

In 1966, Bhosle's performances in the duets from one of music director R.D. Burman's first soundtracks, for the movie Teesri Manzil, won popular acclaim. Reportedly, when she first heard the dance number "Aaja Aaja", she felt she would not be able to sing this westernised tune. While Burman offered to change the music, she refused, taking it as a challenge. She completed the song after ten days of rehearsals, and "Aaja Aaja", along with such other songs as "O Haseena Zulfonwali" and "O Mere Sona Re" (all three duets with Rafi), became successful. Shammi Kapoor, the film's leading actor, was once quoted as saying– "If I did not have Mohammad Rafi to sing for me, I would have got Asha Bhosle to do the job". Bhosle's collaboration with Burman resulted in numerous hits and a marriage. During the 1960-70s, she was the voice of Hind film actress and dancer, Helen, on whom "O Haseena Zulfon Wali" was picturised. It is said that Helen would attend her recording sessions so that she could understand the song better and plan dance steps accordingly. Some of their other popular numbers include "Piya Tu Ab To Aaja" (Caravan) and "Yeh Mera Dil" (Don), among others.

By the 1980s, Bhosle, although highly regarded  for her abilities and versatility, had sometimes been stereotyped  as a "cabaret singer" and a "pop crooner". In 1981 she attempted a different genre by singing several ghazals for the Rekha-starrer Umrao Jaan, including "Dil Cheez Kya Hai", "In Aankhon Ki Masti Ke", "Yeh Kya Jagah Hai Doston" and "Justuju Jiski Thi". The film's music director Khayyam, had lowered her pitch by half a note. Bhosle herself expressed surprise that she could sing so differently. The ghazals won her the first National Film Award of her career. A few years later, she won another National Award for the song "Mera Kuchh Saamaan" from Ijaazat (1987).

In 1995, 62-year-old Bhosle sang for actress Urmila Matondkar in the movie Rangeela. The soundtrack featured songs like "Tanha Tanha" and "Rangeela Re" sung by her, and composed by music director A. R. Rahman, who would go on to record several songs with her. During the 2000s, several of Bhosle's numbers became chartbusters, including "Radha Kaise Na Jale" from Lagaan (2001), "Kambakht Ishq" from Pyaar Tune Kya Kiya (2001), "Yeh Lamha" from Filhaal (2002) and "Lucky Lips" from Lucky (2005). In October 2004, The Very Best of Asha Bhosle, The Queen of Bollywood, a compilation album of songs recorded by Bhosle for albums and Hindi language films that were released between 1966 and 2003, was released.

In 2012 she judged Sur Kshetra.

In 2013, Bhosle debuted in the film Mai in the title role, at the age of 79. Bhosle played the role of a 65-year-old mother who suffers from Alzheimer's disease and is abandoned by her children. She received positive reviews for her acting as well from critics.

In May 2020, Bhosle launched her YouTube channel named "Asha Bhosle Official".

Partnership with music directors

O. P. Nayyar

Music director O. P. Nayyar's association with Asha is part of Hindi film lore. He was the composer who first gave Asha her own identity. Many people have speculated about a romantic relationship between the two.

Nayyar first met Asha in 1952, at the music recording of Chham Chhama Chham. He first called her for a film called Mangu (1954), and gave her a big break in C.I.D. (1956). However, it was the success of Naya Daur (1957) that made the duo very popular. After 1959, she was emotionally and professionally involved with Nayyar.

The team of O. P. Nayyar and Asha Bhosle is best remembered for their breezy and sometimes sirenish songs. Some good examples of their sensuous numbers are "Aaiye Meherbaan" picturised on Madhubala (Howrah Bridge, 1958) and "Yeh Hai Reshmi Zulfon Ka Andhera", (Mere Sanam, 1965). "Aao Huzoor Tumko" (Kismat) and "Jaaiye Aap Kahan" (Mere Sanam) were also popular. They also recorded songs for many hit movies like Tumsa Nahin Dekha (1957), Ek Musafir Ek Hasina (1962) and Kashmir Ki Kali (1964). O. P. Nayyar used the Asha Bhosle-Mohammad Rafi duo for his most popular duets such as "Ude Jab Jab Zulfein Teri" (Naya Daur), "Main Pyaar Ka Rahi Hoon" (Ek Musafir Ek Haseena), "Deewana Hua Baadal" and "Ishaaron Ishaaron Mein" (Kashmir Ki Kali).

Asha recorded her last song for O. P. Nayyar in the movie Pran Jaye Par Vachan Na Jaye (1974). The solo number "Chain Se Humko Kabhi" garnered many awards, but it was not included in the movie.

They separated on 5 August 1972. It is not clear what made them part their ways. On being asked the reason for their parting, O. P. Nayyar once said, "I know astrology very well. I knew that one day I had to part with her. Something also happened that upset me, so I left her." Nevertheless, he also said "...now that I am seventy-six, I can say that the most important person in my life was Asha Bhosle. She was the best person I ever met."

The parting of Asha Bhosle and O. P. Nayyar was bitter, and probably therefore she has hesitated to give Nayyar his due. While talking about O. P. Nayyar in an interview with The Times of India, she once remarked, "Whichever composer gave me work, it was because my voice was suited to his music at that point. No one musician did me any favor by asking me to sing for him." She gives the credit for her first big break to B. R. Chopra, the producer of Naya Daur.

Khayyam
Another music director who recognized Asha's talent early was Khayyam. Their partnership dates back to his first movie Biwi (1948). Khayyam gave her some good assignments in the 1950s, including Dard and Phir Subah Hogi. However, their collaboration is chiefly remembered for the songs of Umrao Jaan.

Ravi
Music composer Ravi considered Asha one of his favorite singers. She sang for his first movie Vachan (1955). The melodious lullaby from this movie, "Chanda Mama Door Ke" became an overnight hit among young mothers in India. Ravi got her to sing bhajans for the movies Gharana, Grihasti, Kaajal and Phool Aur Patthar, at a time when most of the composers remembered her only when they needed to record B-grade songs picturized on the vamps or the side-heroines. Ravi and Asha recorded a variety of songs, including the popular comic duet with Kishore Kumar – "C A T...Cat. Cat Maane Billi" (Dilli Ka Thug). The bhajan "Tora Man Darpan" (Kaajal) attained great popularity.

They also recorded songs for many popular movies like Waqt, Chaudhvin Ka Chand, Gumrah, Bahu Beti, China Town, Aadmi Aur Insaan, Dhund and Hamraaz. For Chaudhvin Ka Chand, Ravi wanted Geeta Dutt (the wife of actor and producer Guru Dutt) to sing the songs. But when she backed out, Guru Dutt insisted that Asha sing the songs.

Sachin Dev Burman
Sachin Dev Burman and Lata Mangeshkar, were not on good terms from 1957 to 1962. During this period, S D Burman used Asha as his lead female voice. She and Burman gave many songs in movies such as Kaala Pani, Kaala Bazaar, Insaan Jaag Utha, Lajwanti, Sujata and Teen Deviyaan (1965). They recorded many songs together after 1962 as well.

Rahul Dev Burman (Pancham)

Asha first met Rahul Dev Burman (also known as Pancham) when she was the mother of two and he was in 10th grade having dropped out to pursue music. Their partnership was first noticed in Teesri Manzil (1966). She went on to record a variety of songs with him – cabarets, rock, disco, ghazals and classical.

In the 1970s, Asha and Burman's youthful Western songs took Hindi film music by storm – the raunchy cabaret "Piya Tu Ab To Aaja" (Caravan, picturized on Helen), the rebellious "Dum Maro Dum" (Hare Rama Hare Krishna, 1971), the sexy "Duniya Mein" (Apna Desh, 1972) and the romantic "Chura Liyaa Hai Tumne" (Yaadon Ki Baaraat, 1973). Burman also recorded many hit duets with Asha and Kishore Kumar such as "Jaane Jaan" (Jawani Diwani) and "Bhali Bhali Si Ek Soorat" (Buddha Mil Gaya).

In the 1980s, Burman and Asha recorded subtle numbers for films like Ijaazat (1987) - "Mera Kuch Saaman", "Khaali Haath Shaam Aayi Hai" and "Katra Katra". They also recorded the popular duet "O Maria!" (Saagar).

Asha used to call R. D. Burman "Bubs". She married him in 1980. Their partnership lasted until his death.

R. D. Burman made her sing some of the most legendary songs in Bengali as well, namely "Mohuyae Jomechhe Aaj Mou Go", "Chokhe Chokhe Kotha Bolo", "Chokhhe Naame Brishti" (Bengali version of "Jaane Kya Baat Hai"), "Baanshi Sune Ki Ghore Thaka Jaye", "Sondhya Belae Tumi Aami" and "Aaj Gungun Gun Gunje Amar" (Bengali version of "Pyaar Deewana Hota Hai").

Ilaiyaraaja
Prolific Indian film composer Ilaiyaraaja began employing Asha's vocals in the early 1980s, their earliest collaboration being for the film Moondram Pirai (1982) (remade in Hindi as Sadma in 1983). Their association continued, mostly through the latter half of the 1980s and early 1990s. Another notable song from this period is "Shenbagamae" for the movie Enga Ooru Pattukaran in 1987. In 2000, Asha sung the theme song for Kamal Haasan's political film Hey Ram. The song, "Nee Partha Parvai" in Tamil and Janmon Ki Jwala in Hindi (or Aparna's Theme), was a duet with singer Hariharan.

A. R. Rahman
A. R. Rahman is credited with Asha's "comeback" with Rangeela (1994). Songs like "Tanha Tanha" and "Rangeela Re" were chartbusters. She and Rahman went on to record more hits like "Mujhe Rang De" (Thakshak), "Radha Kaise Na Jale" (Lagaan, duet with Udit Narayan), "Kahin Aag Lage" (Taal), "O Bhanware" (Daud, duet with K. J. Yesudas), "Venilla Venilla" (Iruvar, 1999), "September Madham" (Alaipayuthey, 2000) and "Dhuan Dhuan" (Meenaxi, 2004).

Jaidev
When S D Burman's assistant Jaidev started giving music independently, he got Asha to sing some of his songs as well. They worked in Hum Dono (1961), Mujhe Jeene Do (1963), Do Boond Pani (1971) and other movies. In 1971, the pair released an LP of eight non-film devotional songs and ghazals called An Unforgettable Treat. Asha considered Jaidev a close friend who stood by her when she was struggling personally and professionally. Upon his death in 1987, she released a compilation album of lesser-known songs he had composed for her, called Suranjali.

Shankar–Jaikishan
Shankar–Jaikishan worked with Asha, although not as extensively as some other composers did. However, the trio produced quite a few hits including the seductive "Parde Mein Rehne Do" (Shikar, 1968). Asha got her second Filmfare Award for the song. She also sang "Zindagi Ek Safar Hai Suhana" (Andaz, 1971) for Shankar–Jaikishan, in which she tried to yodel like Kishore Kumar, whose version of the song is more popular. Shankar–Jaikishan also used her voice in Boot Polish (1954), Shree 420 (1955), Jis Desh Mein Ganga Behti Hai (1960), Junglee (1961), An Evening in Paris (1968), and Kal Aaj Aur Kal (1971), among others. When Raj Kapoor was not on speaking terms with Lata Mangeshkar, Asha sang the songs of Mera Naam Joker (1970).

Anu Malik
Composer Anu Malik and Asha have recorded many singles together, including songs for his first movie Sohni Mahiwal (1984). Their most popular songs include "Ye Lamhaa Filhaal" (Filhaal) and "Kitabein Bahut Si" (Baazigar) among others. The four lines sung by Asha in Malik's "Jab Dil Mile" (Yaadein) stood out among voices of Sukhwinder Singh, Udit Narayan and Sunidhi Chauhan. Their latest collaboration has been for the song, "Prem Mein Tohre" (Begum Jaan) which also received praise. Asha had also sung for Anu's father Sardar Malik in the 1950s and 1960s, most notably in Saranga (1960).

Other composers
Madan Mohan recorded a number of songs with Asha, including the popular folk number "Jhumka Gira Re" picturised on Sadhana from Mera Saaya (1966). In Chhoti Si Baat (1975), Asha sang the "Jaaneman Jaaneman" number with K. J. Yesudas for Salil Chowdhury. Salil's 1956 movie Jagte Raho also had a number recorded by Asha, "Thandi Thandi Saawan Ki Phuhaar". Another Asha patron is the young composer Sandeep Chowta, who got her to sing "Kambakht Ishq", a duet with Sonu Nigam for the movie Pyaar Tune Kya Kiya (2001). The song gained major popularity among the Indian youth.

Asha has worked with Lata-patrons like Laxmikant–Pyarelal, Naushad Ali, Ravindra Jain, N. Dutta and Hemant Kumar. When Naushad was asked to sum up the essential difference between Lata and Asha, he said that Asha "lacks certain something which Lata, and Lata alone has." Later he stated in an interview, "Maybe I said it because I then had a closed ear on Asha". Naushad, later in his life, also admitted that he has been unfair to Asha. Asha has also worked with other noted Hindi film composers like Jatin–Lalit, Bappi Lahiri, Kalyanji-Anandji, Usha Khanna, Chitragupt, and Roshan.

Non-film music

Private albums
In a rare feat, noted lyricist Gulzar, music director R.D. Burman and Asha Bhosle came together in 1987 to create a double album, titled Dil Padosi Hai, which was released on 8 September 1987. In 1995, Asha underwent the gatha bandan (thread-tying) ceremony with Hindustani classical music maestro Ali Akbar Khan to learn a classical repertoire held within the Maihar gharana (stylistic school of Indian classical music), as handed down to Khan by his father Allauddin Khan (the guru of Ravi Shankar). Later, Asha and Ustad Ali Akbar Khan recorded eleven fixed compositions (or bandishes) in California for Legacy, a private album that earned them a Grammy Award nomination.

In the 1990s, Asha experimented with remixed R.D. Burman songs. She was criticized by many, including Khayyam, for tampering with old melodies. Nevertheless, albums like Rahul And I became quite popular. In 1997, Asha did a private Indipop album Janam Samjha Karo with Lesle Lewis. The album was hugely popular and won her many awards including the 1997 MTV Award.

Asha had been once asked by director B. R. Ishara to compose music for one of his films, but she had politely declined. In 2002, she turned music composer with the album Aap Ki Asha, an eight-song music and video album. The lyrics were written by Majrooh Sultanpuri. The album was released by Sachin Tendulkar on 21 May 2001 at a lavish party in Mumbai. The album received mixed reviews.

Asha had spotted Pakistani singer Adnan Sami's talent when he was about 10 years old. At that time, she was performing in London with R. D. Burman. It was she who had asked him to pursue his interests in music. When Adnan grew up and became a professional musician, Asha sang the title duet with him for his best-selling album Kabhi to nazar milao. The two came together again in the album Barse Badal. The album comprises eight songs, based on Indian Classical music. She contributed the song Yun Na Thi to the recording Womad Talking Book Volume Four: An Introduction to Asia 1 on Womad Records.

Asha has sung ghazals for many albums like Meraj-E-Ghazal, Aabshar-e-Ghazal and Kashish. In 2005, Asha released a self-titled album as a tribute to the four ghazal maestros – Mehdi Hassan, Ghulam Ali, Farida Khanum and Jagjit Singh. The album features eight of her favorite ghazals like Farida Khanum's Aaj Jaane Ki Zid Na Karo, Ghulam Ali's Chupke Chupke, Aawargi and Dil Mein Ek Lahar, Jagjit Singh's Ahista Ahista and Mehdi Hassan's Ranjish Hi Sahi, Rafta Rafta and Mujhe Tum Nazar Se. These classic ghazals were recreated with modern sounds by musician Pandit Somesh Mathur. The album was aimed at the younger generation, who, according to Asha, are "turned off" by the traditional sounds of tabla and sarangi.

Numerous compilations of Asha's songs have been released as well. To commemorate her 60th birthday, EMI India released three cassettes: Bala Main Bairagan Hoongi (devotional songs), The Golden Collection: Memorable Ghazals (non-film ghazals by composers such as Ghulam Ali, R.D. Burman and Nazar Hussain), and The Golden Collection: The Ever Versatile Asha Bhosle (44 popular film songs).

In 1996, Asha Bhosle sang Channeache Rati among several other songs in Rajendra Talak's Konkani album Daryachya Deger with Suresh Wadkar.

In 2006, she recorded an album Asha and Friends, singing duets, with film actors Sanjay Dutt and Urmila Matondkar and famous cricket player Brett Lee, with whom she sang, "You're the One for Me" (Haan Main Tumhara Hoon). All these songs composed by Shamir Tandon were shot on video by journalist turned director S. Ramachandran.

In 2014, she sang a song titled "Dil Lagane Ko Dil Jab" for the International Women's Day special album, Women's Day Special: Spreading Melodies Everywhere. It was composed by Shamir Tandon and penned by Saajan Agarwal.

In 2015, Asha Bhosle recorded a Sufi song, "Fariyad Sun Fakira" with co-singers Javed Ali and Pankaj Kumar.

In 2016, she recorded the album "82" with music director Mandar Agashe who decorated six of Suresh Bhat's ghazals with his musical touch of pop, reggae, blues, and rock. The album was named after her age at the time of recording. About the album "82", Bhosle said, "I had a long association with Suresh Bhat and have a lot of memories about him. With this album, I will relive those memories. I don't need to tell you how powerful his words were and, with the album, that power can be experienced again. Mr. Bhat always wanted to record these ghazals in the pop and rock genres and it is good to see Mandar fulfilling that wish. I just wish Mr. Bhat was among us today."

In 2020, during the COVID-19 pandemic and the lockdown throughout the nation, Bhosle along with many noted artists like S. P. Balasubrahmanyam, Udit Narayan, Kailash Kher, Usha Uthup, Shaan, Alka Yagnik, Sonu Nigam and other 200 artists of India, made a song named 'Jayatu Jayatu Bharatam' to make the country unite during the pandemic.

Concerts and collaborations with foreign artists
In the 1980s and 1990s, Asha went globe-trotting, staging concerts in Canada, Dubai, UK, US and many other countries. In October 2002, she did a concert with Sudesh Bhosle and others, in London, for "Help the Aged" to help raise funds for the elderly in India. In 2007 she toured the US, Canada, and West Indies in a tour called "The Incredibles". In this tour, she was accompanied by singers Sonu Nigam, Kunal Ganjawala and Kailash Kher. This tour, originally scheduled for only 12 concerts, went on to run more than 20.

In the early 1990s, Asha sang with Boy George ("Bow Down Mister") and Stephen Lauscombe. In 1997, she sang a love song with the boy band Code Red, at the age of 64. She also recorded the song "The Way you Dream" (One Giant Leap), with Michael Stipe that was used in the English movie, Bulletproof Monk. The song was also released on the album 1 Giant Leap for 2002.

In 1997, the British band Cornershop paid tribute to Asha with their song "Brimful of Asha," an international hit which was later remixed by Fatboy Slim. In 2001, the CD single of Nelly Furtado's "I'm Like a Bird" included a "Nellie vs. Asha Remix" created by Digital Cutup Lounge.

In 2003, British opera pop singer Sarah Brightman sampled her song "Dil Cheez Kya Hai" on her album Harem. It was used as the intro for her song "You Take My Breath Away".

In 2005, American string quartet Kronos Quartet re-recorded R D Burman compositions like "Chura Liya", "Piya Tu" and "Mera Kuchh Saaman" among others and got Asha to sing them. Despite her age, she recorded three to four songs a day, leaving the quartet members stupefied. On 23 August 2005, You've Stolen My Heart: Songs from R.D. Burman's Bollywood was released in US. The album was nominated for Grammy Awards 2006 in the category of "Best Contemporary World Music Album". In the 1990s, a friend had introduced David Harrington of Kronos Quartet to the song "Aaj ki raat." Harrington was mesmerised, and the song ended up on the album Kronos Caravan.

Also in 2005, The Black Eyed Peas sampled her songs "Ae Naujawan Sab Kuchh Yahan" (Apradh, 1972) and "Yeh Mera Dil Pyaar Ka Diwana" (Don, 1978) in their hit single "Don't Phunk with My Heart". In late 2006, Asha collaborated with Australian test cricket star, Brett Lee. The single, "You're the One for Me", debuted at number 4 on the charts and reached a peak position of number 2.

In 2006 Asha recorded one song for the soundtrack of the Pakistani movie Mein Ek Din Laut Kay Aaaonga. She sang the song titled "Dil Key Taar Bajey", with famous Pakistani pop singer Jawad Ahmed. It was aired as part of the film's promotional campaign and became very popular, featuring on top music charts.

Bengali career
Asha Bhosle sang her first Bengali song in 1958 under the banner of HMV.  The songs were duets with Binod Chattopadhyay and composed by Manna Dey. The following year, she recorded her very first "Pooja Songs" from HMV with music arranged by Dey again. She sang many pooja songs in Bengali.
Rahul converted some Hindi tracks to Bengali such as "Gunjone Dole Je Bhramar" (made from Gunguna Rahe Hain Bawre in Aradhana), "Chokhe Name Bristi" (from Jane Kya Baat Hai), "Gungun Gunje" (from Pyaar Deewana Hota Hain). In the mid 1970s, she would frequently sing for Bengali songs tuned by Sudhin Dasgupta, Nachiketa Ghosh rtc.  In 1975, she sang the duet "Sara Pyaar Tumhara" with Kishore Kumar in Anand Ashram and "Amar Swapno Tumi" in its Bengali version with the same title. In the 1970s, she sang a lot of songs in films such as Chhadmabeshi, Bandi, Mouchak, Anand Ashram etc. In 1980, she sang the Bhajan "Kunjo Bihari He Giridhari" in Mayer Ashirbad. In 1981, she sang the duet "Adho Alo Chhayate" with Kishore in Kalankini Kankanati. In 1982, she sang a Bengali Adhunik song "Kotha Hoyechilo" in Troyee for Debasri Roy. In 1986, the duet with Kishore Kumar "Chiridini Tumi Je Amar" composed by Bappi Lahiri. In 2014, she has created the album "Pancham Tumi Kothay" in honor of her husband Rahul Dev Burman's 75th birth anniversary. In this album she has sung 8 songs previously composed by Burman. She has also sung in a 2014 film Parapar at the age of 81.

Marathi career
Asha started her playback singing in Marathi with the mythological film Gokulcha raja. Since then Asha Bhosle has sung thousands of Marathi film songs, Bhavgeet (non-film songs). Natya sangeet from Master Deenanath Mangeshkar's Marathi Sangeet natak has also been recorded in Asha Bhosle's voice. During the 1950s and 60s, Asha and her sister Lata were the main playback singers for Marathi films. She won the 1962 Maharashtra government best singer award for the Marathi film, Manini. In 1963 music director Vasant Desai used her voice with Talat Mehmood in the film, Molkarin.

Some Marathi films in which Asha Bhosle has rendered her voice are: Molkarin, Jait re Jait, Gharkul, Devbappa, Sangtye Aika, Singhasan, Saamna, Maratha Tituka Melvava, and Nivdung.

Asha also sang many Marathi devotional songs (abhang) with music composed by Srinivas Khale.

Personal life
Asha's house is situated in Prabhukunj Apt on the Peddar Road area of South Mumbai. Asha, at the age of 16, had eloped with 31-year-old Ganpatrao Bhosle. They separated in 1960. They have three children and five grandchildren. The eldest of her three children, Hemant Bhosle (named after Hemant Kumar), spent most of his early years as a pilot and quit to have a brief career as a music director. Bhosle's daughter Varsha committed suicide on 8 October 2012; she was 56 years old and worked as a columnist for The Sunday Observer and Rediff.

Asha's youngest child, Anand Bhosle, has studied business and film direction. He manages Asha's career. Her grandson, Chaitanya (Chintu) Bhosle (Hemant's son) is a part of the world of music. He is a member of India's first & only boy band, "A Band of Boys". Her sisters Lata and Usha Mangeshkar are playback singers. Her other, sister Meena Mangeshkar and brother Hridaynath Mangeshkar are music directors. Her granddaughter Zanai Bhosle (daughter of Anand Bhosle) runs iAzure Apple Inc. Store in Mumbai. Zanai is an emerging singer and Kathak dancer and had sung with Asha Bhosle.

Hemant Bhosle 's best known compositions were the Kishore-Asha duets such as "Aji Kaho Kya Haal Hai" from Anpadh picturised on Vijendra Ghatke and "Sarika" and "Salamat Raho Tum" from the same film "Anpadh" picturised on Ashok Kumar and Sarika. Hemant died of cancer in 2015.

Asha's first husband Ganpatrao was her personal secretary. Their marriage failed miserably in 1960. Her husband and in-laws mistreated her. After a few years of marriage, Asha was turned out by a suspicious Ganpatrao and she went to her maternal home with two children while pregnant with her third child. She continued to sing in films to earn money. Asha married Rahul Dev Burman in 1980. This was the second marriage for both Rahul and Asha. Rahul, 6 years younger than her, earlier got divorced from Rita Patel in 1971.

Asha is an excellent cook and cooking is her favorite hobby. She often gets flooded with requests by Hind film celebrities for kadai ghosht and biryani dishes and has rarely turned down a request. In fact, her paya curry, Goan fish curry and dal are very popular with the Kapoor family of Hindi films. Once, when asked in a The Times of India interview, what if her singing career had not taken off, she said "I would have become a cook. I'd have cooked in four houses and made money." The love of cooking got Asha into a successful restaurant business. She runs restaurants in Dubai and Kuwait called Asha's. Asha's offers traditional north-western Indian cuisine. It has a presence in the Wafi City development in Dubai, as well as three restaurants in Kuwait, at The Avenues Mall, the Marina Mall and a brand new third outlet at the Spoons Complex. Other restaurants can be found in Abu Dhabi's Khaldiya Mall, Doha's Villagio and Bahrain's City Center Mall, with future outposts planned for Dubai's Mall of the Emirates and Cairo, Egypt. Asha Bhosle has a 20% stake in the business. Asha is not involved in the day-to-day running of the restaurant which is looked after by the Wafi Group. She takes care of the kitchen and the décor. She personally trained the chefs for almost six months. According to a December 2004 report in Menu Magazine, Russell Scott, a former head of Harry Ramsden's (the fish and chips chain), secured the UK rights to the Asha's brand and planned to open up to 40 restaurants over the next five years. As part of her chain of restaurants, Asha has recently opened a new restaurant in Birmingham, UK. Asha Bhosle will be on view at the Madame Tussauds gallery that opens in New Delhi soon.

Rivalry with Lata Mangeshkar
Asha's sibling rivalry with Lata Mangeshkar is often talked about, in spite of their insistence that these are just tales. As young children, they were very close. As a child, Lata used to carry Asha all the time. They were so inseparable that when Lata went to school she would take Asha with her. One day the teacher protested and said that they cannot have two students on one fee. Lata refused to return to school without Asha and quit her studies.

Lata considered Asha's act of eloping with her lover as irresponsible, leaving her alone to sing and earn for the family. This led to tensions between them. Asha herself stated in an interview – "It was a love marriage and Lata didi did not speak to me for a long time. She disapproved of the alliance." At one time, their relationship was very adversarial and there have been periods of non-communication.

In her initial days in the industry, Asha always played second fiddle to her elder sister. Some say that Lata had once criticised Asha's relationship with O. P. Nayyar. This widened the rift between the two sisters and O. P. Nayyar also decided that he would never work with Lata. O. P. Nayyar had once revealed that "Asha and Lata, staying in opposite flats at Bombay's Peddar Road, shared a maid. Said maid's responsibility was to come and tell the younger sister that Lata had just recorded something wonderful for Asha to lose her vocal poise. Such was her Lata phobia that it took me some months to convince Asha that she had a voice individualistic enough to evolve a singing style all of her own." Asha once said that she has worked for years to create a voice and a style that was different from Lata, so that she could carve her own niche and not be banished to live in her sister's shadow.

Asha and Lata have also sung together. Their first duet was for the film Daman (1951). Some of their songs include "Man Bhawan Ke Ghar aye" (Chori Chori, 1956), "Sakhi ri sun bole papihaa us paar" (Miss Mary, 1957), "O chand jahaan woh jayein" (Sharada, 1957), "Mere Mehboob Mein Kya Nahi" (Mere Mehboob, 1963), "Unse Nazrein Mili" (Gazal, 1964), "Ai kash kisi deewane ko" (Aaye Din Bahar Ke, 1966), "Jabse Laagi Toose Najariya" (Shikar, 1968), "Main Haseena Nazneena Koi Mujhsa Nahi" (Baazi, 1968), "Main Chali Main Chali" (Padosan, 1968), "Chhap tilak sab" (Main Tulsi Tere Aangan Ki, 1978), and "Man kyun behka" (Utsav, 1984). While singing, Lata used to hold her notebook in her right hand, while Asha held hers in the left hand. This meant Lata had her face away from Asha, making it difficult for them to "anticipate" each other.

The movie Saaz was supposedly based on Lata and Asha's rivalry. Asha said about the movie – "To have two women in long plaits, take a couple of incidents and exaggerate them into a 3-hour film is such a waste of time." In the last few years, Asha and Lata have often been seen in public, enjoying each other's company. In an interview with The Times of India, Asha once said – "I remember, sometimes both of us would be at a function and some industry types would ignore me and interact only with her, as if to prove their loyalty. Later, didi and I would have a good laugh!"

In popular culture
British alternative rock band Cornershop released "Brimful of Asha" in 1997. The song, dedicated to Asha Bhosle, became an international hit single for the band and topped the UK Singles Chart in February 1998. A number of remixes have been released as well, notably by Norman Cook, also known as Fatboy Slim.

Discography

Hindi songs

Bengali songs

Urdu songs

Awards

Filmfare awards
Asha Bhosle has won seven Filmfare Best Female Playback Awards of 18 nominations. She won her first two awards in 1967 and 1968. (Mangeshkar asked not to be considered for the award nominations after 1969 to promote new talent). After receiving the award in 1979, Bhosle emulated her elder sister and requested that her name not be considered for the nominations hereafter. Despite this, Bhosle is the most frequent winner of this award to date, tying with Alka Yagnik. She was later given a Special Award for Rangeela in 1996, and the Filmfare Lifetime Achievement Award in 2001. Following is the list of her Filmfare Awards:

Filmfare Best Female Playback Award
 1968: "Garibon ki Suno" (Dus Lakh, 1966)
 1969: "Parde Mein Rehne Do" (Shikar, 1968)
 1972: "Piya Tu Ab To Aaja" (Caravan, 1971)
 1973: "Dum Maro Dum" (Hare Rama Hare Krishna, 1972)
 1974: "Hone Lagi Hai Raat" (Naina, 1973)
 1975: "Chain Se Humko Kabhi" (Pran Jaye Par Vachan Na Jaye, 1974)
 1979: "Yeh Mera Dil" (Don, 1978)

Special Award
 1996 – Special Award (Rangeela, 1995)

Lifetime Achievement Award
 2001 – Filmfare Lifetime Achievement Award

National Film Awards
Asha has won the National Film Award for Best Female Playback Singer twice:
 1981: Dil Cheez Kya Hai (Umrao Jaan)
 1986: Mera Kuch Samaan (Ijaazat)

IIFA Awards 
IIFA Award for Best Female Playback
 2002: "Radha Kaisa Na Jale" (Lagaan)

Grammys 
Bhosle is one of the very few Indian artists who has been nominated at the Grammy Awards.

39th Grammy Awards - 1997
- Grammy Award for Best Global Music Album - Ali Akbar Khan's Legacy (nominated)

48th Grammy Awards - 2006
- Grammy Award for Best Contemporary World Music Album - You've Stolen My Heart (nominated)

Other awards
Asha has won numerous other awards, including:
 1987: Nightingale Of Asia Award (from the Indo–Pak Association, UK).
 1989: Lata Mangeshkar Award (Government of Madhya Pradesh).
 1997: Screen Videocon Award (for the album Jaanam Samajha Karo).
 1997: MTV Award (for the album Jaanam Samajha Karo).
 1997: Channel V Award (for the album Jaanam Samjha Karo).
 1998: Dayawati Modi Award.
 1999: Lata Mangeshkar Award (Government of Maharashtra)
 2000: Singer of the Millennium (Dubai).
 2000: Zee Gold Bollywood Award (for Mujhe Rang De from Thakshak).
 2001: MTV Award (for Kambakht Ishq).
 2002: BBC Lifetime Achievement Award (presented by the UK Prime Minister Tony Blair).
 2002: Zee Cine Award for Best Playback Singer - Female (for Radha Kaise Na Jale from Lagaan).
 2002: Zee Cine Special Award for Hall of Fame.
 2002: Sansui Movie Award (for Radha Kaise Na Jale from Lagaan).
 2003: Swaralaya Yesudas Award for outstanding contributions to Indian music.
 2004: Living Legend Award by the Federation of Indian Chamber of Commerce and Industry.
 2005: MTV Immies, Best Female Pop Act for Aaj Jaane Ki Zid Na Karo.
 2005: Most Stylish People in Music.

Honours and recognitions
 In 1997, Asha became the first Indian singer to be nominated for the Grammy Award, for Legacy, an album with Ustad Ali Akbar Khan.
 She has received seventeen Maharashtra State Awards.
 She received the Dadasaheb Phalke Award in 2000 for her outstanding contribution to Indian cinema.
 She holds honorary doctorates from the university of Amravati and University of Jalgaon in Literature and from the University of Salford in Arts.
 She has received The Freddie Mercury Award for Outstanding Achievement in Arts.
 The Birmingham Film Festival paid her a special tribute in November 2002.
 She was honoured with the Padma Vibhushan by the Government of India.
 In 2021, Bhosle was honoured with the Maharashtra Bhushan by the Government of Maharashtra.
 She was among top 20 music icons of the past 50 years.
 In 2011 the Guinness Book of World Records officially acknowledged Bhosle, at The Asian Awards, as the most recorded artist in the history of music. She was awarded a certificate for "the most studio recordings (singles) from Sebastian Coe for recording up to 11,000 solo, duet and chorus-backed songs and in over 20 Indian languages since 1947". At the event she was also awarded the Lifetime Achievement Award.
 Asha Bhosle is the recipient of the first Doctor of Literature (D.Litt.) of the Jodhpur National University.
 BBC list of 100 inspiring women for 2015.

Further reading

See also

Mangeshkar Family

Notes

References

External links

 
 
 
 

1933 births
Living people
Bengali-language singers
Bollywood playback singers
Dadasaheb Phalke Award recipients
English-language singers from India
Women guitarists
Gujarati-language singers
Hindi-language singers
20th-century Indian women singers
Indian women playback singers
Indian guitarists
Tamil playback singers
Marathi-language singers
Marathi playback singers
Nepali-language singers from India
Recipients of the Padma Vibhushan in arts
Russian-language singers
Tamil-language singers
Konkani-language singers
Kannada playback singers
People from Sangli
Mangeshkar family
Best Female Playback Singer National Film Award winners
Filmfare Awards winners
Filmfare Lifetime Achievement Award winners
International Indian Film Academy Awards winners
Screen Awards winners
Zee Cine Awards winners
20th-century Indian singers
21st-century Indian singers
21st-century Indian women singers
Women musicians from Maharashtra
Singers from Maharashtra
Marathi people
BBC 100 Women